Allan Thomson (1788-1884) was a banker, railroad executive, and city councilman of Wilmington, Delaware.

In 1838, Thomson served as treasurer for three of the four railroads that built the first rail link from Philadelphia south: the Wilmington and Susquehanna Railroad, the Delaware and Maryland Railroad, and the Philadelphia, Wilmington and Baltimore Railroad, for which service he is named on the 1839 Newkirk Viaduct Monument.

Notes

18th-century American businesspeople
1788 births
1884 deaths
19th-century American businesspeople